Wannebach may refer to:

 Wannebach (Lenne), a river of North Rhine-Westphalia, Germany, right tributary of the Lenne
 Wannebach (Ruhr, Westhofen), a river of North Rhine-Westphalia, Germany, right tributary of the Ruhr
 Wannebach (Ruhr, Ergste), a river of North Rhine-Westphalia, Germany, left tributary of the Ruhr